The men's 800 metres at the 2022 World Athletics Championships was held at the Hayward Field in Eugene from 20 to 23 July 2022.

Summary

After missing the Olympics, defending champion Donavan Brazier was eliminated in the heats. World leader Max Burgin did not start. Aside from Olympic Champion Emmanuel Korir the rest of the Olympic and previous championships podium athletes did not make it to this event.

In the final, Slimane Moula came off the break looking to take the lead, tangling elbows with Peter Bol en route.  His lead lasted through the second turn when Marco Arop went by, then taking the bell at 52.02.  Gabriel Tual moved behind him on the rail, while Wycliffe Kinyamal Kisasy went to the outside. Arop opened up a metre gap, Korir followed Kisasy as the four broke away a couple of metres from the other half of the field down the backstretch. Korir poured it on through the final curve, passing Tual, then Kisasy, then 70 metres from home, Arop. As Korir pulled away, Arop tightened up and struggled home. Leading the second group before the turn, Djamel Sedjati also sped through the turn, catching Kaul just before the end of the turn. Kisasy faded on the home stretch, eventually finishing last, leaving the struggling Arop as his next target, caught 12 metres before the finish for silver.  Dead last entering the turn, 17 year old Emmanuel Wanyonyi weaved his way through the crowd but didn't get to Arop in time to grab a medal.

Records
Before the competition records were as follows:

Qualification standard
The standard to qualify automatically for entry was 1:45.20.

Schedule
The event schedule, in local time (UTC−7), was as follows:

Results

Heats 

The first 3 athletes in each heat (Q) and the next 6 fastest (q) qualify for the semi-finals.

Semi-finals 

The first 2 athletes in each heat (Q) and the next 2 fastest (q) qualify for the finals.

Final

References

800
800 metres at the World Athletics Championships